Reba may refer to:

 Reba McEntire, an American country musician and actress
 Reba (TV series), a sitcom featuring her
 Reba (album), one of her albums
 Reba: Duets, another one of her albums
 Reba (Midianite king), in the Hebrew Bible
 Reba Rambo, a Christian music singer and songwriter
 Reba, the mail lady from Pee Wee's Playhouse
 "Reba", a song by Phish
 Reba, a product line of cross-country mountainbike suspension forks made by RockShox
 Reba, the cyprinid fish Labeo ariza
 Reba Sabrina Hinojos, birth name of "Cheetah Girl" Sabrina Bryan

English feminine given names